Alain Jacques Pluchet (Grugies, 1 May 1930 – Saint-Aubin-lès-Elbeuf, 24 November 2020) was a French politician.

Biography
He was a Member of the Senate of France from 1983 till 1998 for Rally for the Republic. Pluchet died from COVID-19 at age 90 on 24 November 2020 in Saint-Aubin-lès-Elbeuf during the COVID-19 pandemic in France.

References

1930 births
2020 deaths
French Senators of the Fifth Republic
Deaths from the COVID-19 pandemic in France
Rally for the Republic politicians
Senators of Eure
People from Aisne